Mancha Júcar-Centro is a comarca of the Province of Albacete, Spain.

Comarcas of the Province of Albacete